Chorabali is a 2012 Bangladeshi action thriller film written and directed by Redoan Rony. It stars Indraneil Sengupta, Joya Ahsan, Shahiduzzaman Selim and many more. It was Rony's debut film. It released on 21 December 2012.

Cast
 Indraneil Sengupta as Sumon
 Joya Ahsan as Noboni Afroz
 Shahiduzzaman Selim as Ali Osman (Mafia Don)
 A.T.M. Shamsuzzaman as Chief Politician
 Sohel Rana as Hayder Khan
 Jannatul Ferdoush Peya as Suzana
 Iresh Zaker as Swapan
 Shamima Nazneen as Sumon's mother

Accolades
At the 37th Bangladesh National Film Awards, Chorabali won in five categories. Joya Ahsan won her second National Film Award for Best Actress in a row. ATM Shamsuzzaman won Best Supporting Actor. Shahiduzzaman Selim received his first National Award, Best Performance in a Negative Role. Rony won Best Dialogue, and Ripon Nath won Best Sound Recording. At the 41st Bachsas Awards, Chorabali won in two categories. Peya won Best Supporting Actress, and Rony won Best Story.

References

External links
 

2012 films
2012 action thriller films
2010s crime thriller films
Bengali-language Bangladeshi films
Bangladeshi action thriller films
Bangladeshi crime thriller films
Bangladeshi gangster films
Films scored by Anupam Roy
Films scored by Indradeep Dasgupta
2010s Bengali-language films